Temperature is a physical quantity that expresses hot and cold.

Temperature may also refer to:

Science and technology
 Thermodynamic temperature, a quantity defined in thermodynamics
 Color temperature, of a light source
 Effective temperature, of a body such as a star or planet
 Human body temperature
 Fever or "having a temperature", the elevation of the body temperature
 Noise temperature, a measure of the noise of an electronic component

Music
 "Temperature" (song), a song released in 2006 by Sean Paul
 "Temperature" a song by Zion I from True & Livin'
 "Temperature", a song by Blaque from Blaque Out
 "Temperature", a song by Little Walter

Other uses
 Temperature (game theory), a measure of the value of a game to its players

See also
 
 Doneness, a gauge of how thoroughly cooked a cut of meat is based on its color, juiciness, and internal temperature
 Planetary equilibrium temperature, a theoretical temperature that a planet would be as a black body being heated only by its parent star
 Thermal radiation, generated by the thermal motion of particles in matter
 Heat (disambiguation)